Sebastian Aigner (born 3 January 2001) is an Austrian professional footballer who plays as a centre back for Austrian Football Bundesliga club SCR Altach.

Club career
On 11 June 2021, he joined SCR Altach on a three-year contract.

Honours
Red Bull Salzburg Youth
Jugendliga U18: 2019
FC Liefering

Runner-up
 Austrian Football First League: 2021

References

External links 

Living people
2001 births
Austrian footballers
Austria youth international footballers
Association football defenders
FC Red Bull Salzburg players
FC Liefering players
SC Rheindorf Altach players
2. Liga (Austria) players
Austrian Football Bundesliga players